is a Japanese former freestyle swimmer. She competed at the 1956 Summer Olympics and the 1960 Summer Olympics.

References

External links
 

1937 births
Living people
Japanese female freestyle swimmers
Olympic swimmers of Japan
Swimmers at the 1956 Summer Olympics
Swimmers at the 1960 Summer Olympics
Sportspeople from Aichi Prefecture
Asian Games medalists in swimming
Asian Games gold medalists for Japan
Asian Games bronze medalists for Japan
Swimmers at the 1958 Asian Games
Medalists at the 1958 Asian Games
20th-century Japanese women